Jorge Germán Pacheco (1889 – 1957) was a Uruguayan footballer. He played in 29 matches for the Uruguay national football team from 1910 to 1917. He was also part of Uruguay's squad for the 1916 South American Championship.

References

External links
 

1889 births
1957 deaths
Uruguayan footballers
Uruguay international footballers
Place of birth missing
Association football midfielders